Yek also known as Salai are the collective of clans of the native people of Kangleipak (Manipur).The natives included among the yek include Anal, Tangkhul, Mao, Maring, Kabui, Chothe, Purum, Khoibu, and Kharam..The clan names come from various dialects and surnames but mean the same thing. All natives of Kangleipak are included in the 7 major yek or parent clan. It may be noted that the term Hao used to mean tribes by Meitei people may be the common name of the native of Manipur Kingdom as both Meitei and various other hao share deep similarity in culture and tradition.

See also
Clan name in Meetei language
 Mangang
 Luwang
 Khuman
 Angom
 Moilang
 Kha Nganpa
 Salai Leishangthem

Reference 

Genealogy articles needing expert attention
Clans of Meitei
Clans
History of Manipur